"Sylvie" is a 1998 song written and performed by British pop group Saint Etienne and released as the first single from their fourth album, Good Humor (1998). Produced by Swedish record producer, composer and musician Tore Johansson, it peaked at number 12 on the UK Singles Chart and number 62 on the Eurochart Hot 100. The song also reached number seven in Scotland and number two on the UK Indie Singles Chart. The accompanying music video was directed by Björn Lindgren and filmed in Havana, Cuba.

Critical reception
Larry Flick from Billboard noted that the song "contrasts vibrant music with heartbreaking lyrics". Dino Scatena from The Daily Telegraph declared it a "pop gem", describing it as "melancholic" and "simply euphoric". Marc Weingarten from Entertainment Weekly called it a "frothy pop-dance" treat. A reviewer from Herald Sun remarked that it "begins with a classical piano flourish and develops into an upbeat bass and drum dance gem." Mike Boehm from Los Angeles Times viewed it as "a typically light confection that owes a lot to ABBA's "Dancing Queen", although it puts a twist and a spin on the Swedes' swooning luster." He added that Cracknell "goes on to flesh out the role of an older sister who fears losing her boyfriend to little sister's charms." 

A reviewer from The Mirror complimented it as "a brilliantly-crafted heartbreaker, [that] was released a while back and reached No 12 but deserved better." Mike Pattenden from Music Week noted it as "a tale of two sisters competing for the same man". Brad Beatnik from their RM Dance Update gave it five out of five, picking it as Tune of the Week. Jim Wirth from NME stated that the song, together with "He's on the Phone" are "a stellar amalgamation of handbag house and Bacharachian pop aesthetics." Joshua Klein from Pitchfork remarked that "the band even tips its hat to ABBA" on the track. Rob Sheffield from Rolling Stone commented, "Even when Sarah sings about boy trouble – in "Sylvie", her little sister tries to steal her beau – she sounds cooler than ice cream and warmer than the sun." Fiona Shepherd from The Scotsman declared it as "a direct pop song telling a tale of sibling love rivalry."

Track listing
 CD maxi, Europe, CRESCD 279 (1998)
"Sylvie" – 4:44
"Afraid to Go Home" – 3:28
"Zipcode" – 3:02
"Hill Street Connection" – 3:53

 CD maxi, Europe, CRESCD 279X (1998)
"Sylvie" (Trouser Enthusiasts' Tintinnabulation Edit) – 4:11
"Sylvie" (Trouser Enthusiasts' Tintinnabulation Mix) – 8:04
"Sylvie" (Stretch 'N' Vern Mix) – 9:12
"Sylvie" (Faze Action Friday Night Boiler Mix) – 10:06

Charts

References

1998 singles
Saint Etienne (band) songs
Songs written by Bob Stanley (musician)
Songs written by Pete Wiggs
1998 songs
Songs written by Sarah Cracknell
Creation Records singles